HMS Intrepid was an  protected cruiser of the Royal Navy built on the River Clyde and launched in 1891. She was subsequently converted as a minelayer in the latter half of her career and ultimately sunk as a blockship during the Zeebrugge Raid on 23 April 1918.

History
Ordered under the Naval Defence Act 1889, Intrepid was laid down in 1889 at the yard of the London and Glasgow Shipbuilding Company.
Following completion in November 1892 Intrepid was held at Portsmouth. During 1896-99 she served on the North America & West Indian Station, then in 1899 returned to Portsmouth. After a refit, she returned to service in March 1900, when she was placed in the Fleet Reserve at Portsmouth.

In 1902 she was commissioned at Portsmouth for service on the Mediterranean station. She left that city on 14 October, visiting Plymouth and Gibraltar en route before arriving at the station headquarters at Malta later the same month. Between October 1902 and 1904 she served in the Mediterranean, visiting various ports and taking part in manoeuvres. In late 1902 she was at Port Said, where members of her crew provided the naval guard for the Duke and Duchess of Connaught as they visited the city in December, en route for India.

From 1904 she saw harbour service at Portsmouth until 1909.

Along with a number of other ships of her class, as she became obsolete as a cruiser she was converted at Chatham Dockyard into a minelayer, carrying 100 mines and with armament reduced to four 4.7-inch guns. In 1910 she recommissioned at Chatham. On the outbreak of the First World War Intrepid was based at Dover, undertaking minelaying duties as part of the Dover Patrol.

In 1915-16 she became a Depot ship, North Russia. In 1917 she was in use as a depot ship in the White Sea as part of the British North Russia Squadron.

She was prepared for the raid by being filled with cement. She was sunk at the entrance to the Bruges Canal to try and prevent it being used by German U-Boats. She was subsequently broken up when the canal was cleared.

References

Publications
  Vol. 1 • Vol. 2

External links
HMS Intrepid, Index of 19th Century Naval Vessels
HMS Intrepid at Naval-History.net

 

Apollo-class cruisers
Ships built on the River Clyde
1891 ships
World War I cruisers of the United Kingdom